Cass McCombs (born November 13, 1977) is an American musician and songwriter. Since 2002 he has released ten albums, an EP and a B-sides compilation under his own name. McCombs' music blends elements of many styles including American roots music, underground music, country, psychedelia and international music. His satirical lyrics, often the focal point, touch on the ambiguities between the personal, the political, mortality and nature.

In 2016, the New York Times referred to McCombs as "one of the great songwriters of his time."

McCombs released his debut EP Not The Way (2002), debut album A (2003) and follow-up Prefection (2005) via Monitor Records and 4AD. His early work was critically acclaimed and quickly earned him a devoted following. In 2007 McCombs signed to Domino Records and released Dropping the Writ. His fourth album Catacombs (2009), produced by Ariel Rechtshaid, significantly increased his exposure and was followed by a pair of well-received albums in 2011, Wit's End and Humor Risk. Big Wheel and Others, a double album, was released in 2013. Spin called it "a towering achievement." His final release on Domino was the b-sides and rarities collection A Folk Set Apart: Rarities, B-Sides & Space Junk, ETC. (2015). McCombs signed to ANTI- Records in 2016 and released Mangy Love, which NME referred to as "McCombs' richest ever recording." In 2019 he released his ninth studio album, Tip of the Sphere, and published his debut poetry collection, Toy Fabels, with Spurl Editions.

Career 
Blending genres such as rock, folk, psychedelic, punk, and alt country, McCombs has played in numerous bands in the Bay Area and Pacific Northwest during the 1990s, often in DIY spaces, before relocating to New York City. He moved to San Francisco in 2001, where he recorded his debut E.P., entitled Not the Way E.P., released on Monitor Records in Baltimore. McCombs then recorded a Peel Session for John Peel in 2003, and that year released his first LP A, also touring with Baltimore's OXES as his backing band. McCombs and his band spent much of 2003 and 2004 touring, performing everywhere from the All Tomorrow's Parties festival to house shows. McCombs otherwise divided his time amongst the Pacific Northwest, England and Baltimore.

In early 2005, he released PREfection on Monitor Records and 4AD, and in support of the album he toured with Modest Mouse. Later that year, he moved to Southern California to begin work on his third full-length, Dropping the Writ, which was released on October 9, 2007, by Domino Records. It was named one of Amazon.com's Best Albums of 2007. Also in 2007 he toured with Ariel Pink's Haunted Graffiti. He signed a multiple-album deal with Domino Records, who released his following four records including Catacombs (2009), which was voted one of the "50 Top Albums on the Year" by Pitchfork. It was followed by Wit's End (2011), Humor Risk (2011), and Big Wheel and Others (2013).

He toured with John Cale in 2012, and also performed at the benefit concert Occupy Sandy. Other bands he has performed or toured with include Ariel Pink, Cat Power, Band of Horses, Andrew Bird, The Decemberists, Arcade Fire, Peter Bjorn and John, Papercuts, The Shins, Iron and Wine, Deerhoof, The Walkmen, Jana Hunter, Thurston Moore, Joe Russo and The War On Drugs.

His single "Bradley Manning" premiered on the Democracy Now News Hour in 2012. His songs have been featured in films including the surf film The Present (2009), and Ralph Arlyck documentary Following Sean, as well as notable skate videos featuring Jason Dill, Jerry Hsu Chima Ferguson and Dylan Rieder. His song "Bobby, King of Boys Town" appeared in HBO show Girls (Season 2, Episode 9 – "On All Fours").

In 2014, he did a co-headlining tour with the Meat Puppets.

McCombs is a member of The Skiffle Players, who released their debut LP, Skifflin on February 12, 2016.

In June 2016, McCombs performed at the Primavera Sound and Field Day music festivals.

McCombs ANTI- Records debut, Mangy Love was released on August 26, 2016.

In 2020, Spurl Editions published McCombs' debut poetry collection Toy Fabels, with illustrations by McCombs.

His tenth studio album, Heartmind, was released on Anti- on August 19, 2022.

Discography

Studio albums 
A (2003)
PREfection (2005)
Dropping the Writ (2007)
Catacombs (2009)
Wit's End (2011)
Humor Risk (2011)
Big Wheel and Others (2013)
Mangy Love (2016)
Tip of the Sphere (2019)
Heartmind (2022)

EPs 
Not the Way E.P. (2002)

Compilations 
A Folk Set Apart (2015)

References

External links 

CassMcCombs.com
Mystery Man – Interview w/ Vice Magazine
Review of Tip of the Sphere by Pitchfork
Review of PREfection by Pitchfork
Transcript of interview on National Public Radio's World Cafe show
Portland Mercury article by Zac Pennington

1977 births
Living people
American male singer-songwriters
Singer-songwriters from California
4AD artists
21st-century American singers
21st-century American male singers
Domino Recording Company artists
Record Collection artists
Anti- (record label) artists